The Standing on the Shoulder of Giants World Tour was a concert tour by English band Oasis, which took place in 1999-2001. The tour was in promotion of their fourth studio album Standing on the Shoulder of Giants.

History
After a disagreement within the band Noel left the tour after 24 May 2000, quitting overseas touring with Oasis. He only returned for shows within the United Kingdom and Ireland, before re-joining the band fully after the tour had ended.

The live album Familiar to Millions was recorded at the two concerts at Wembley Stadium. Due to Liam being drunk at the second concert, voiceovers were used from concerts in Yokohama. The second Wembley Stadium concert was also broadcast worldwide the same evening. 

Noel Gallagher dedicated the song "Hey Hey My My" to Kurt Cobain when they played in his hometown of Seattle on the sixth anniversary of his death.

Four warm up dates took place in the United States in December 1999, before the main tour started.

Set list
This set list is representative of the performance on 21 July 2000 at Wembley Stadium in London. It does not represent the set list at all concerts for the duration of the tour.

"Fuckin' in the Bushes"
"Go Let It Out"
"Who Feels Love?"
"Supersonic"
"Shakermaker"
"Acquiesce"
"Step Out"
"Gas Panic!"
"Roll with It"
"Stand by Me"
"Wonderwall"
"Cigarettes & Alcohol"
"Don't Look Back in Anger"
"Live Forever"
Encore:
"Hey Hey, My My (Into the Black)"
"Champagne Supernova"
"Rock 'n' Roll Star"

Other songs performed:
Some Might Say
Where Did It All Go Wrong?
Sunday Morning Call
D'You Know What I Mean?
My Generation
Helter Skelter
I Can See A Liar
Columbia
Morning Glory
Slide Away
I Am the Walrus

Tour dates

Notes

References

2000 concert tours
Oasis (band) concert tours